Anton Blomqvist (born March 7, 1990) is a Swedish former professional ice hockey defenceman who most notably played in the HockeyAllsvenskan (Allsv). He currently serving as the head coach of Allsvenskan club, AIK IF.

Playing career
Before coming to North America, Blomqvist played over 100 games of professional hockey with the Swedish Malmö Redhawks in HockeyAllsvenskan and European Trophy. He was selected by the Columbus Blue Jackets in the 6th round (167th overall) of the 2009 NHL Entry Draft. During the 2010–11 season, he left the Redhawks and signed a three-year entry level contract with the Blue Jackets on March 17, 2011.

In his two years in North America he was assigned to the Blue Jackets American Hockey League affiliate, the Springfield Falcons and the Evansville IceMen of the ECHL. After making a negligible impact, Blomqvist returned on loan to Malmö for the final year of his contract with Columbus on June 18, 2013.

As an impending free agent with the Blue Jackets on May 22, 2014, Blomqvist opted to remain in the HockeyAllsvenskan signing with IK Oskarshamn.

Career statistics

References

External links

1990 births
Columbus Blue Jackets draft picks
Evansville IceMen players
Living people
Malmö Redhawks players
Springfield Falcons players
IK Oskarshamn players
IK Pantern players
Swedish ice hockey defencemen
People from Kristianstad Municipality
Sportspeople from Skåne County